Events from the year 1922 in Croatia.

Incumbents
 Monarch – Alexander I

Events
February 19 – First issue of Borba, the newsletter of the banned Yugoslav Communist Party, published in Zagreb

Arts and literature

Sport

Births
January 7 – Ivan Milat-Luketa, painter and sculptor (died 2009)
February 11 – Ivo Padovan, physician (died 2010)
April 10 – Vesna Parun, poet (died 2010)
May 10 – Krešo Golik, film director and screenwriter (died 1996)
May 14 – Franjo Tuđman, statesman (died 1999)
May 22 – Mirjana Gross, historian (died 2012)
July 1 – Kruno Prijatelj, art historian (died 1998)
September 12 – Jure Bilić, communist politician (died 2006)
September 21 – Vladimir Ruždjak, opera singer (died 1987)
November 9 – Maja Bošković-Stulli, ethnologist (died 2012)
November 30 – Nenad Lhotka, ballet master (died 2011)

Deaths
February 5 – Slavoljub Eduard Penkala, inventor (born 1871)
February 7 – Vinko Dvořák, Czech-Croatian physicist and former Rector of the University of Zagreb (born 1848)
April 23 – Vlaho Bukovac, painter (born 1855)

References

 
Years of the 20th century in Croatia
Croatia